Bankstown Reservoir is a heritage-protected water tower and a local landmark situated in the suburb of Bankstown, Sydney, New South Wales, Australia. The reservoir features various decorative attributes, plastered by hand, which lack in other functional reservoirs. Established in 1920, the reservoir serves a large area of South-Western Sydney.

History
In 1826, the reservoir was once a hanging site for bushrangers. Patrick Sullivan and James Moran, both members of Sullivan's gang, were hanged at the site on 18 October 1826 after creating a stir in the Bathurst district. The site on which the Reservoir sits may be connected with the earliest period of Bankstown's European settlement, transport routes, the bushrangers which traversed Liverpool Road and the appearance and carrying out of law and order in the district.

Construction
Construction of Bankstown Reservoir began in October 1918. The reservoir was built to meliorate the pressure on Ashfield Reservoir and obviate pumping from Ryde. The concrete for the reservoir was made on site, with the sandstone acquired from a quarry at Potts Hill.

Power was administered by a portable steam engine. The rendering was made by ornamental exterior plastering and waterproofing of the interior of tank by cement gun. Hand rendering began in February 1920. Extra adjustments to the reservoir include the aluminium roof built in 1962 to preserve water quality. It is likely that the concrete walkway was removed or covered by the roof.

At the time of its construction, Bankstown reservoir was the largest elevated reinforced concrete elevated reservoir in the country. After its completion, elevated reservoirs built in reinforced concrete became common until the 1950s, with one similar tower established in the 1930s in Padstow Heights.

Proposed developments
In 2015, it was proposed by Bankstown City Council and Sydney Water for the tower to be ornamented with decorative lights from sunset to sunrise, akin to those displayed in Vivid Sydney. Bankstown councillor Naji Najjar's vision was to turn the tower into a tourist attraction that could rival Coffs Harbour's Big Banana and Goulburn's Big Merino, stating "I believe it is important that Bankstown City Council, together with Sydney Water, take the opportunity to promote this icon of our city". As part of Cr Najjar's plan, the area would also be embellished with fencing, landscaping and Australian native gardens, with interpretative signage, including a stone monument revealing the site's history. He concludes, "The lighting could have themes for various charity and community events and awareness campaigns". The council would eventually write to the State Government and await approval.

Design

Bankstown reservoir is built of reinforced concrete and contains a circular water tank. Being akin to a rotunda, it is backed up by 36 strengthened concrete pillars and decorative arches which encircle the establishment. The inward columns are assembled of reinforced concrete while the outer ones consist of plain concrete. Construction aggregate was used for the concrete in the elevated tank and its columns and sandstone conglomeration for the bowed encirclement and ground foundations at the bottom. Instead of a handrail at the top, the reservoir has a concrete rectangular paneled parapet wall.

The tower's arches have a moulding and a circular pattern above each column, with the base of the tank having moulded apron with rectangular panels above. Furthermore, the structure was restrengthened to abide to the earthquake code in 2009. The design of Bankstown Reservoir exemplifies the Victorian and neoclassical architectural of the early 20th century. Its structure is mostly intact and has sustained minor alterations thus retaining its integrity. The reservoir has been roofed to safeguard water quality in the 1960s-1970s.

Features
Bankstown Reservoir supplies drinking water to households as far west as Villawood and Condell Park in the southwest, Croydon in the east, and Auburn and North Strathfield in the north. The reservoir has a foot bridge to a walkway on the top of the water tower, passing through the centre of the tank. The reservoir is surrounded by brush box, coral tree, poplar and fig trees.

The reservoir is renowned for being the first concrete reservoir to be elevated on concrete piers. Sydney Water Heritage Program leader Phil Bennett stated the Bankstown reservoir has "the highest level of heritage protection because it is the oldest of the class of elevated reinforced concrete reservoirs". Mr Bennett concluded, “It’s quite decorative so it has aesthetic value and it sits very prominently on a hill top and it can be seen for miles, so it has landmark values”. The reservoir supplies drinking water to households in areas such as Villawood, Condell Park, Croydon, Auburn and North Strathfield.

Access

The reservoir is situated on the corner of Hume Highway and Stacey Street in the northeastern periphery of Bankstown, bordering Greenacre. However though, the main entry to the water tower is from Beresford Avenue, which is a dead end street accessed from Hume Hwy.

Heritage register
The reservoir was listed on the New South Wales State Heritage Register as a site of State significance on 18 November 1999 with the following citation:

Bankstown Elevated Reservoir has a considerable level of state heritage significance as a representative example of a common reservoir design strongly favoured by Board engineers during the early period of the twentieth century. It is the oldest elevated reservoir constructed in reinforced concrete that is still in use. At the time of its construction it was the largest elevated reinforced concrete reservoir, and symbolised the technological advancements of the time. It displays decorative and formal architectural qualities and shows a high level of workmanship and technical accomplishment. It has several features which distinguish it from other elevated reservoirs of this type, including; the central concrete access tower; the concrete footbridge connecting the tower to the walkway and which encircles the perimeter of the top bank; and the mercury U-shaped tube depth gauge. It is currently still in active service and makes a positive contribution to the streetscape of Bankstown.

See also
Paddington Reservoir
Balmain Reservoir
Boothtown Aqueduct

References

Attribution 
 This Wikipedia article was originally based on the Bankstown Reservoir (Elevated), listed on the "New South Wales State Heritage Register" published by the Government of New South Wales under CC-BY 3.0 AU licence (accessed on 27 March 2018).

External links

Reservoirs in Sydney
1920 establishments in Australia
Buildings and structures in Sydney
Water towers in Australia
Bankstown, New South Wales
New South Wales State Heritage Register
Arches and vaults
Round buildings in Australia
Sandstone buildings in Australia
Neoclassical architecture in Australia
Rotundas in Australia
Towers completed in 1920
Federation style architecture
Romanesque Revival architecture in Australia
Sydney Water